Eucosma conterminana, the lettuce tortricid, is a moth of the family Tortricidae.

Description
 The wingspan is 15–19 mm. Adults are on wing from July to August.

The larvae feed on the Lactuca serriola, Lactuca vireola and other Lactuca species. Larvae are considered a pest on cultivated lettuce. Young larvae live in the flowerheads, producing very little webbing and sometimes feeding partially exposed. Later they burrow into the developing seedheads and feed on the ovaries.

Distribution
E. conterminana is found in Europe, from the Baltic region to the Caucasus, in the Trans-Caucasus, Kazakhstan, Asia Minor, from central Asia to southern Siberia and in China and Mongolia.

References

External links

 Lepidoptera of Belgium
 UKMoths
 Eurasian Tortricidae

Eucosmini
Moths described in 1845
Moths of Asia
Moths of Europe
Taxa named by Achille Guenée